Sbragia is a surname. Notable people with the surname include:

Giancarlo Sbragia (1926–1994), Italian actor, stage director, and playwright
Mattia Sbragia (born 1952), Italian actor
Ricky Sbragia (born 1956), Scottish footballer and manager